Check Your Guns is a 1948 American Western film directed by Ray Taylor. It stars Eddie Dean and Nancy Gates.

Cast
 Eddie Dean as Eddie Dean
 Nancy Gates as Cathy Jordan
 Roscoe Ates as Soapy Jones
 George Chesebro as Banker Farrell
 I. Stanford Jolley as Brad Taggert
 Mikel Conrad as Ace Banyon
 Lane Bradford as Slim Grogan
 Terry Frost as Sloane
 Wally West as henchman
 Dee Cooper as henchman
 William Fawcett as Judge Hammond
 Andy Parker as Jeff

References

External links
 

1948 films
1948 Western (genre) films
American Western (genre) films
American black-and-white films
Films directed by Ray Taylor
Producers Releasing Corporation films
1940s English-language films
1940s American films